Sard-e Row or Sar-e Daru may refer to:
 Sar-e Daru, Kerman